Pauli is a surname and also a Finnish male given name (variant of Paul) and may refer to:

Arthur Pauli (born 1989), Austrian ski jumper
Barbara Pauli (1752 or 1753 - fl. 1781), Swedish fashion trader
Gabriele Pauli (born 1957), German politician
Hans Pauli (fl. 1570), Swedish monk and alleged sorcerer
Hansjörg Pauli (1931–2007), Swiss musicologist, writer, and music critic
Johannes Pauli (c. 1455 – after 1530), German Franciscan writer
Pauli Pauli (born 1994), Australian Rugby league player
Reinhold Pauli (1823–1882), German historian
Wolfgang Pauli (1900–1958), Austrian theoretical physicist
Pauli Murray (1910–1985), American academic and author
Dr. Pauli, a nemesis in Captain Video and His Video Rangers

See also 
St. Pauli
Pauli exclusion principle
Pauly (surname)
Paulis (disambiguation), includes list of people with name Paulis
Germanic-language surnames
German-language surnames
Finnish masculine given names

Surnames from given names